UnityPoint Health Trinity Medical Center is a group of medical facilities based out of the Quad Cities of Illinois and Iowa.  The main campus, Trinity Rock Island, is in Rock Island, Illinois, with Trinity Moline in Moline, Illinois and Trinity Bettendorf in Bettendorf, Iowa.  In 2010, Trinity acquired Unity Medical Center in Muscatine, Iowa, later renaming the facility Trinity Muscatine.  The health system is a senior affiliate of UnityPoint Health, the state's first and largest integrated health care system.  It is one of two main health care providers in the Quad Cities area, the other being Genesis Health System.

The hospital traces its history back to the late 19th century.  The current Trinity Medical Centers in Illinois were the result of a merger between United Medical Center and Franciscan Medical Center.

Quad Cities
Healthcare in Illinois
Healthcare in Iowa